DevCodeCamp is an online coding bootcamp.

History 
DevCodeCamp was founded in 2015 and was the first coding bootcamp in Wisconsin. 
The school's headquarters is based in the Ward4 building in Milwaukee. In 2020, the coding bootcamp began offering classes completely online and will remain with that format allowing hopeful adult students nationwide to apply regardless of location, Once students complete the bootcamp they receive interview and resume training.
 
In fall 2017, benefits provided by the Forever GI Bill for veterans covered tuition for DevCodeCamp.

References

External links 
 Official Website

Organizations based in Milwaukee
Software development
Coding schools